Marmaduke Furness, 1st Viscount Furness (29 October 1883 – 6 October 1940) was a British shipping magnate and during his lifetime one of the richest men in the world.

Background
Furness was the son of Christopher Furness, 1st Baron Furness and Jane Annette Suggit. He served as Chairman of Furness Withy, the shipbuilding firm, and was also involved in the steel and iron business. He succeeded his father as 2nd Baron Furness in 1912, and in 1918 was created Viscount Furness, of Grantley in the West Riding of the County of Yorkshire. In November 1929, he was reported as being Laird of the Glen Affric Estate in the Scottish Highlands.

Marriages and relationships
Lord Furness was married three times. His first marriage was to Ada "Daisy" Hogg, daughter of an English businessman, G. J. H. Hogg of Seaton Carew. She was heavily involved in the Red Cross during World War I. She died on 28 February 1921, aboard the Furness yacht Sapphire off the coast of Portugal, while recovering from an operation and was buried at sea. She and Lord Furness had two children:
 Hon. Averill Furness (22 July 1908 – 1936); she married, in 1932, Andrew Rattray, 1882–1933
 Hon. Christopher Furness, VC (1912–1940)

Lord Furness married secondly, in 1926, Thelma Morgan Converse, the former Mrs James Vail Converse and a daughter of Harry Hays Morgan Sr., an American diplomat. They divorced in 1933 as a result of Lady Furness's affairs with Aly Khan and Edward, Prince of Wales (later Edward VIII). They had one son:
 William Anthony Furness, 2nd Viscount Furness, aka Tony (1929–1995)

Furness's third and final marriage was to Enid Cavendish (née Lindeman), the Australia-born widow of Brig. Gen. Frederick Cavendish; she was also the widow of Roderick Cameron. She and Lord Furness were married in 1933. By this marriage he had three stepchildren: 
 Roderick "Rory" William Cameron (1914–1985)
 Patricia Enid Cavendish (1925–2019) 
 Frederick Caryll Philip Cavendish, 7th Baron Waterpark (1926–2013)

In June 1921, Lord Furness was engaged to Julie Thompson (née Julie Francis Eleanor Phillips, died 15 April 1967), an American socialite and former wife of stockbroker George Lee Thompson. She had previously turned down offers of marriage by other nobles including Grand Duke Nicholas of Russia and his cousin Grand Duke Alexander Michaelovitch. The engagement was broken off.

Death
Lord Furness died on 6 October 1940, aged 56, 5 months after his son Christopher was killed in the Battle of Arras. He was succeeded by his younger and only surviving son, Tony, as second viscount.

References

1883 births
1940 deaths
Viscounts in the Peerage of the United Kingdom
20th-century British businesspeople
Viscounts created by George V